Rise is the eleventh studio album released by Jamaican dancehall artist Shaggy, released on September 28, 2012, in European territories such as Germany, Austria and Switzerland. The album was not released in the United States; however it did receive a limited digital release in the United Kingdom, without physical release.

The album is the European-equivalent of his tenth studio album, Summer in Kingston, containing nine of the ten tracks from that album, packaged alongside the new singles "World Citizen" featuring Jahcoustix and "Girls Just Want to Have Fun", featuring Eve, as well as three new tracks, and the European hit single "Fly High" featuring Gary "Nesta" Pine, which despite being released in 2009, had not previously appeared on any of Shaggy's albums.

Background
Following the release of Summer in Kingston, Shaggy returned to the studio to continue recording his collaborative album with Sly & Robbie. However, prior to the album's release, Shaggy released a brand new single to the European market, "World Citizen", featuring singer-songwriter Jahcoustix, which was recorded aside from the Sly & Robbie project. Following the single's success, the decision was made to repackage Summer in Kingston, which had never before been released in Europe, and release it for the first time in the region alongside a select amount of new material. The Sly & Robbie track "She Gives Me Love" from Summer in Kingston is the only track omitted from the re-package, due to the fact it will appear on Shaggy's next worldwide release.

A month prior to the album's release, the official lead single, "Girls Just Want to Have Fun", a re-interpretation of the Cyndi Lauper original, featuring singer Eve, was released in Europe to chart success, followed by the album's release on September 28, 2012. The album's three new tracks, "Rise", "Diva" and "Get Back My Baby", were all recorded just weeks prior to the album's release.

Track listing

References

2011 albums
Shaggy (musician) albums